Tom French (born 27 November 1983 in Hillingdon, London, England) is a rugby union player for London Wasps in the Guinness Premiership. His position of choice is as at prop.

He made only his second appearance for Wasps' first team at loose-head prop against Leicester Tigers in the 2007 Heineken Cup Final. He impressed up against Leicester's powerful scrummager Julian White, a current England international.

French was called into the England Saxons squad in June 2008.

References

External links
Wasps profile
England Profile

1983 births
Living people
English rugby union players
Nottingham R.F.C. players
People educated at Harrow School
Rugby union players from Hillingdon
Rugby union props
Wasps RFC players